Bholu the Elephant is the mascot of Indian Railways, represented as a cartoon of an elephant holding a signal lamp with a green ring in one hand. It was initially designed for the Indian Railways' 150th anniversary commemoration events and was unveiled on 16 April 2002 in Bangalore. In 2003, Indian Railways decided to permanently retain Bholu as its official mascot. A representation of Bholu was placed on the back side of an Indian coin.

Background and Development 
Railways were introduced in India on 16 April 1853, with a line from Bombay to Thane. To commemorate the 150th anniversary of the event, Indian Railways planned a series of events in 2002–2003 which included the launching of a mascot. Bholu was designed by the National Institute of Design in consultation with the Indian Ministry of Railways and was unveiled on 16 April 2002 in Bangalore. On that day, Bholu flagged off the Karnataka Express at 6.25 pm from platform number 1 of the Bangalore city station. According to the Indian Government (Railway Board)'s Manual for Public Relations Department (2007), Bholu was designated for official use effective 15 April 2002. Later, on 24 March 2003, they decided to retain Bholu as the official mascot of Indian Railways.

Popularity 
The mascot became very popular in India. When asked for their opinion on Bholu, Indian Railway officials said that Bholu is friendly and helpful. An Indian Government official release in 2003 described Bholu as an "ethical, responsible, sincere and cheerful icon". The green light in his hand symbolizes movement, the intention to travel with safety and positivism. In 2003 the Indian Government released a two-() rupee coin which carried the impression of Bholu on its reverse side.

References

External links

Indian Railways
Fictional elephants
Elephants in India
Indian mascots
Animal mascots
Cartoon mascots
Male characters in advertising
Transport culture of India
Mascots introduced in 2003